In maggiore ("Greater") is a jazz studio album by the sardinian trumpeter Paolo Fresu with the Italian bandoneonist Daniele di Bonaventura. This album was released in the label ECM Records in March 2015.

Composition
This album is the second collaboration between Paolo Fresu and Daniele di Bonaventura, in January 2011, they released "Mistico Mediterraneo" on the ECM label (ECM 2220). On this album, they played music from all around the world, like a Bretton lullaby, a Latin American theme and a Chilean resistance song. The making of this album is told on the Fabrizio Ferraro's movie "Wenn aus dem Himmel..."

Track listing
ECM – ECM 2412.

Personnel
Daniele di Bonaventura – bandoneon
Paolo Fresu – trumpet, flugelhorn

References

ECM Records albums
2015 albums
Albums produced by Manfred Eicher